The 2021 Thoreau Tennis Open was a professional tennis tournament played on outdoor hard courts. It was the second edition of the tournament which is part of the 2021 WTA 125K series. The tournament had been upgraded from ITF 60K to WTA 125K, marking its first edition as a challenger event. It took place in Concord, United States between 2 and 8 August 2021. The tournament could not be staged in 2020 due to COVID-19 pandemic.

Singles main-draw entrants

Seeds

 1 Rankings are as of 26 July 2021.

Other entrants
The following players received wildcards into the singles main draw:
  Alycia Parks
  Katrina Scott
  Lulu Sun
  Sophia Whittle

The following player received entry using a protected ranking:
  Rebecca Marino

The following players received entry from the qualifying draw:
  Robin Anderson
  Mariam Bolkvadze
  Victoria Duval 
  Liang En-shuo

The following player received entry as a lucky loser:
  Alexa Glatch

Withdrawals 
Before the tournament
  Clara Burel → replaced by  Rebecca Marino
  Vitalia Diatchenko → replaced by  Beatriz Haddad Maia
  Anastasia Gasanova → replaced by  Tatjana Maria
  Nao Hibino → replaced by  Kurumi Nara
  Nuria Párrizas Díaz → replaced by  Usue Maitane Arconada
  Alison Van Uytvanck → replaced by  Alexa Glatch

Doubles main-draw entrants

Seeds

1 Rankings are as of 26 July 2021.

Other entrants
The following pair received a wildcard into the doubles main draw:
  Brittany Collens /  Victoria Hu

Withdrawals
Before the tournament
  Ankita Raina /  Eden Silva → replaced by  Mona Barthel /  Ankita Raina

Champions

Singles

  Magdalena Fręch def.  Renata Zarazúa 6–3, 7–6(7–4)

Doubles

  Peangtarn Plipuech /  Jessy Rompies def.  Usue Maitane Arconada /  Cristina Bucșa 3–6, 7–6(7–5), [10–8]

References

External links
 2021 Thoreau Tennis Open at wtatennis.com
 Official website

2021 WTA 125 tournaments
2021 in American tennis
Tennis in Massachusetts
2021 in sports in Massachusetts
August 2021 sports events in the United States